Luctor International is the importing company for Van Gogh Vodkas, vodka-based liqueurs, and Van Gogh gin.

History
The company was originally developed in the early 1980s to import Dutch beer. In 1987 David van de Velde, then owner of Luctor, revived the company and began importing Leyden Dry Gin. This premium Dutch gin garnered many accolades. In September 1999 Luctor incorporated Van Gogh gin into its portfolio and shortly followed with Van Gogh Vodkas in January 2000 – both of which earned high ratings from the Spirits Journal as well as the Wine Enthusiast, and other trade and consumer publications.

In 2008, van de Velde retired, and the company changed leadership with Norman Bonchick taking the role as chairman and CEO and Jonathan Bleiberg assuming the role of president and COO. Soon after, Luctor International merged its brand identity with its corporate identity by filing for a DBA under the name Van Gogh Imports. Today Van Gogh Imports's portfolio continues to grow and now includes Leyden Dry Gin, Van Gogh gin, Van Gogh vodkas as well as Van Gogh vodka-based liqueurs.

Origin of name
Luctor International was named for the region in the Netherlands where the company's founder, David van de Velde, was born. He saw the name as a symbol of the Dutch pursuit of perfection in everything from art to flowers to cheese.

The fighting lion on the Luctor crest and the words luctor at emergo – "I fight and will survive" – are a reference to the strength and perseverance of the Dutch.

References

External links
 Company Website
 Brand Website

Distribution companies of the United States